Majorero Progressive Party (PPMAJO) was a centrist insularist political party representing Fuerteventura, and island in the Canary Islands. It was founded and led by Domingo González Arroyo, who founded it after leaving the PP.

In March 2019, it joined the Unión del Pueblo Majorero (led by Águeda Montelongo) to form Gana Fuerteventura.

References

External links
  official website

Political parties established in 2009
Regionalist parties in Spain
Political parties in the Canary Islands